Bluff Street Historic District may refer to:

Bluff Street Historic District (Guttenberg, Iowa), listed on the National Register of Historic Places in Clayton County, Iowa
Bluff Street Historic District (Beloit, Wisconsin), listed on the National Register of Historic Places in Rock County, Wisconsin